Cumberland is a provincial electoral district for the Legislative Assembly of Saskatchewan, Canada. It was created for the 1912 election, and was abolished into Prince Albert East-Cumberland in 1967. It was re-created for the 1975 election. It is the largest electoral district in the province, and at the 2007 general election was the safest seat for the New Democratic Party.

History 
The riding has a strong history of electing New Democrat MLAs, and that region has returned MLAs from the NDP and its predecessor party the Co-operative Commonwealth Federation since 1952. The closest that the NDP came to losing the riding was in the 2008 by-election, which was narrowly won with 49.73% of the popular vote and a plurality of 164.

Member of the Legislative Assembly

This riding has elected the following Members of the Legislative Assembly:

Election results

Cumberland, 1975–present

2020 Saskatchewan general election

2016 Saskatchewan general election

2011 Saskatchewan general election

2008 Cumberland by-election

2007 Saskatchewan general election

2003 Saskatchewan general election

1999 Saskatchewan general election

1995 Saskatchewan general election

1991 Saskatchewan general election

1986 Saskatchewan general election

1982 Saskatchewan general election

1978 Saskatchewan general election

1975 Saskatchewan general election

Cumberland, 1912–1967

References

External links
Website of the Legislative Assembly of Saskatchewan

Saskatchewan provincial electoral districts